Klas Harry Wolff (2 July 1905 – 29 April 1987) was a Swedish boxer who won a silver medal in the featherweight division at the 1927 European Championships. He competed at the 1924 Summer Olympics in bantamweight, but was eliminated in the second round by the eventual gold medalist William Smith of South Africa.

1924 Olympic results
Below are the results of Harry Wolff, a Swedish bantamweight boxer who competed at the 1924 Paris Olympics:

 Round of 32: bye
 Round of 16: lost to William H. Smith (South Africa) by decision

References

1905 births
1987 deaths
Bantamweight boxers
Olympic boxers of Sweden
Boxers at the 1924 Summer Olympics
Swedish male boxers
People from Nyköping Municipality
Sportspeople from Södermanland County
20th-century Swedish people
Djurgårdens IF boxers